was a town located in Isumi District, Chiba Prefecture, Japan.

Ōhara was formed on March 31, 1955 by the merger of the villages of Tōkai, Azuma and Namihana.

On December 5, 2005, Ōhara was merged into the towns of Isumi (former) and Misaki (both from Isumi District), to create the city of Isumi, and thus no longer exists as an independent municipality.

In November 2005 (the last data available before its merger into Isumi), the town had an estimated population of 20,518 and a population density of 308 persons per km2. Its total area was 66.61 km2.

The town's economy was largely based on commercial fishing.

The town was a sister city of Duluth, Minnesota in the United States.

References

External links
Isumi City Website 

Dissolved municipalities of Chiba Prefecture
Isumi